Sadarpur is an upazila of Faridpur District in the Division of Dhaka, Bangladesh.

Geography

Demographics
As of the 2011 Bangladesh census, Sadarpur has a population of 193347. Males constitute 48.14% of the population, and females 51.86%.  Sadarpur has an average literacy rate of 43.20% (7+ years), and the national average of 32.4% literate.

Administration
Sadarpur Upazila is divided into nine union parishads: Akter Char, Bhashanchar, Char Bishnupur, Char Manair, Char Nasirpur, Dheukhali, Krishnapur, Narikelbaria, and Sadarpur. The union parishads are subdivided into 88 mauzas and 328 villages.

The postal code is 7820.

See also
Upazilas of Bangladesh
Districts of Bangladesh
Divisions of Bangladesh

References

Upazilas of Faridpur District